Kesley Kondo    (born December 1, 1989) is a Brazilian baseball pitcher. He attended Bloomington High School, West Los Angeles College and the University of Utah. He represented Brazil at the 2013 World Baseball Classic.

References

External links
Baseball America
Utah bio
High School stats

1989 births
2013 World Baseball Classic players
Brazilian baseball players
Brazilian expatriate baseball players in the United States
Brazilian people of Japanese descent
Living people
Sportspeople from São Paulo
Utah Utes baseball players
West Los Angeles Wildcats baseball players